Code Red is an American action drama television series that ran on ABC from November 1, 1981, to September 12, 1982 and was produced by Irwin Allen. This was Allen's sixth and final television series, and his only series not produced for 20th Century Fox Television.

Overview
The series stars Lorne Greene as Battalion Fire Chief Joe Rorchek and his family, some of whom, his elder sons Ted (Andrew Stevens) and Chris (Sam J. Jones), serve as firemen under his direct command as part of the Los Angeles Fire Department.  In addition, Haley Green (Martina Deignan), the first female firefighter in the LAFD, is under Rorchek's command and serves with distinction both professionally and as a friend of the Rorcheks.

In addition, Joe Rorchek's preteen adopted son, Danny Blake (Adam Rich) serves as a member of the Firefighter Explorers organization, complete with his own uniform and turnout gear.  Although still a child, Danny dreams of joining the family profession and enjoys privileged access to his family's professional activities.  As a result, he has numerous adventures of his own armed with a cool head in the face of crisis and considerable fire safety and first aid skills for his age.  Despite the danger, the male members of the Rorchek family have the full support of Ann Rorchek (Julie Adams), Joe's wife, who is proud of her family's calling.

In addition to family drama, the characters have numerous adventures with the various fires and other emergencies that happen in their operating area.

The series began with a television movie as Joe Rorchek as an arson investigator who is pursuing a dangerous arsonist who uses firebombs to start serious blazes that Rorchek's sons have to fight.  Meanwhile, Green, recently assigned to the Rorcheks' unit, strives to prove herself to skeptical fire fighter Al Martelli (Jack Lindine). When the series was approved for production, Greene's character was reassigned to command the task force "Station 1" (in actuality, the real LAFD Station 49, which was used for establishing and exterior shots during the show's production), located on the city's waterfront as a more suitable premise for the series.  The station is a large one, equipped with not only a varied ground fleet of vehicles including a personal car for Chief Rorchek, but also a helicopter piloted by Chris Rorchek and a fireboat moored at a dock built into the station.

Given that the series was scheduled for early Sunday evening for a family audience, many episodes end with a coda where a cast member addresses the audience about fire safety and first aid.

Episode list

References

External links

 The Irwin Allen News Network's Code Red web pages

1981 American television series debuts
1982 American television series endings
Films directed by J. Lee Thompson
American Broadcasting Company original programming
Television series by Sony Pictures Television
Television series by Irwin Allen Television Productions
1980s American drama television series
English-language television shows
Television shows set in Los Angeles
Television series about firefighting